This is a list of current festivals held within the Canadian province of Ontario, Canada.

Festivals by city
List of festivals in Ottawa
List of festivals in Toronto

Festivals by region

Northeastern Ontario
Algoma Fall Festival (Sault Ste Marie)
Bon Soo Winter Carnival (Sault Ste. Marie)
Cinéfest Sudbury International Film Festival (Sudbury)
Junction North International Documentary Film Festival (Sudbury)
Northern Lights Festival Boréal (Sudbury)
La Nuit sur l'étang (Sudbury)
Queer North Film Festival (Sudbury)
Sudbury Pride (Sudbury)
Sundridge Sunflower Festival (Sundridge)
Up Here Festival (Sudbury)

Northwestern Ontario
Northwest Film Fest (Thunder Bay)
Thunder Pride (Thunder Bay)
Vox Popular Media Arts Festival (Thunder Bay)

Southern Ontario

 Bluesfest International Windsor (Windsor)
Blyth Festival (Blyth)
Boots and Hearts Music Festival (Oro-Medonte)
 Brantford Ribfest  (Brantford)
 Bridges Festival (Mississauga)
Brighton Applefest (Brighton)
Canada Dance Festival (Ottawa)
Canada Day
Canadian Filmmakers' Festival (Toronto)
Canada's Largest Ribfest (Burlington)
Canal Days (August Civic Holiday Weekend - Port Colborne)
Carassauga (May - Mississauga)
Carnival of Cultures (Ottawa)
CMT Music Fest (Kitchener)
Downtown Oakville Jazz Festival (Oakville)
Elmira Maple Syrup Festival (April - Elmira)
Festival of Northern Lights (Owen Sound)
Fergus Scottish Festival and Highland Games (Fergus)
Friendship Festival (Fort Erie)
Goderich Celtic Roots Festival (Goderich)
Havelock Country Jamboree (August - Havelock)
Heatwave (Bowmanville)
Home County Folk Festival (London)

 Kitchener-Waterloo Oktoberfest (October - Kitchener)
London Ontario Live Arts Festival (London)
London Ribfest (August Civic Holiday Weekend - London)
Luminato Festival (June - Toronto)
Mariposa Folk Festival (Orillia)
 MuslimFest (Mississauga)
North by Northeast / NXNE (Toronto)
Nuit Blanche (September - Toronto)
Ottawa Bluesfest (Ottawa)
Ovation Music Festival (Stratford)
Peterborough Summer Festival of Lights (Peterborough)
Pride Week (Toronto)
 Rockton World's Fair (October Thanksgiving Weekend - Flamborough)
 St. Lawrence Shakespeare Festival (St. Lawrence)
Toronto Caribbean Carnival - Toronto Carnival (March - August -Toronto)
Shaw Festival (Niagara-on-the-Lake)
Steam Era (September Labour Day Weekend - Milton)
Stratford Shakespeare Festival (Stratford)
 Strawberry Fields Festival (Aug. 1970 - Bowmanville)
Sunfest (July - London)
Supercrawl (September - Hamilton)
 Taste of the Kingsway (September - Toronto)
Taste of the Danforth (August - Toronto)
The Great India Festival (August - Ottawa)
 Toronto Chinese Lantern Festival (Toronto)
Toronto Design Offsite Festival (Toronto)
Toronto International Film Festival (Toronto)
Toronto Reel Asian International Film Festival (Toronto)
Toronto Ribfest (July Canada Day Weekend - Centennial Park, Etobicoke)
Toronto Rock and Roll Revival (Toronto)
Wallaceburg Antique Motor Boat Outing (Wallaceburg)
Waterloo Festival for Animated Cinema (Waterloo)
WayHome Music & Arts Festival (Oro-Medonte)
Windsor–Detroit International Freedom Festival (Windsor)
Winter Festival of Lights (Niagara Falls)
Winterlude (February - Ottawa)
 The Word on the Street Festival (September - Toronto)

See also

List of festivals in Canada 
Culture of Ontario
Tourism in Ontario

References

External links

Festivals in Ontario

 
Ontario
Festivals
Ontario